Frederick, Freddie, or Fred Mitchell may refer to:
 Frederick Mitchell (bishop) (1901–1979), Anglican bishop in the Church of Ireland
 Frederick Gilbert Mitchell (c. 1885–1962), Chairman of Mitchell Construction
 Frederick John Mitchell (1893–1979), Canadian politician
 Fred Mitchell (artist) (1923–2013), American abstract expressionist, New York School artist
 Fred Mitchell (Bahamian politician) (born 1953), foreign minister of the Bahamas
 Fred Mitchell (baseball) (1878–1970), baseball manager of the 1910s
 Fred Tom Mitchell (1891–1953), President of the Mississippi State College
 Freddie Mitchell (born 1978), American football player
 James Mitchell (1895-1975), England international footballer known as Fred
 William Frederick Mitchell (1845–1914), British naval painter
 Fred Mitchell (Neighbours), fictional character on the Australian soap opera Neighbours
 Freddie Mitchell (EastEnders), a character on EastEnders